Débora dos Santos Nascimento (born June 16, 1985) is a Brazilian actress and model.

Career 
Nascimento began her acting career in film as the protagonist of the short film Cérbero, by director Gastão Coimbra; and on television, in the telenovela Paraíso Tropical, as Elisa. Her natural beauty garnered her attention and she earned a role in the North American production of the film The Incredible Hulk. In the same year, she was featured in the telenovela, Duas Caras as Andréia Bijou.

In 2012, she appeared in the novel Avenida Brasil, playing the character Tessália. In 2013, returned to TV as Taís, in the telenovela Flor do Caribe.

Personal life 
Débora Nascimento was born in Suzano, São Paulo. Her mother is of Italian and Native Brazilian origin, her father is of black African origin.

Nascimento was married for 3 years to businessman Arthur Rangel. They separated in August 2012. Shortly thereafter she began dating castmate from Avenida Brasil, José Loreto. They announced their relationship on the show Domingão do Faustão. Their daughter, Bella, was born in April 2018.

Filmography

Television

Film

Theater

Awards and nominations

References

External links 

1985 births
Living people
21st-century Brazilian actresses
Actresses from São Paulo (state)
Afro-Brazilian actresses
Brazilian people of Italian descent
Brazilian people of indigenous peoples descent
Brazilian television actresses
Brazilian female models
Brazilian film actresses
Brazilian stage actresses
Brazilian bisexual people
People from Suzano
Bisexual actresses
LGBT models
Brazilian LGBT actors